Rangiotu is a farming community in the Manawatu District and Manawatū-Whanganui region in New Zealand's central North Island.

The settlement was known for many years as Oroua Bridge, but was renamed Rangiotu in honour of the local Rangitāne chief, Hoani Meihana Te Rangiotu.

Te Rangimarie Marae was built in 1858 to commemorate peace between Ngāti Raukawa and Rangitāne. The marae currently runs programmes for schools, teaching the Māori history of Manawatū.

Rangiotu is part of the Taikorea statistical area, which also includes Glen Oroua.

History

Early history

A school was built at Oroua Bridge  in 1896 on 2 acres of land gifted by Enereta Te Rangiotu. It later changed its name to Rangiotu School.

Rangiotu Memorial Hall was opened on 18 October 1905 as a basic square building, using donations from the local community.

In 1915, Manawaroa Te Awe Awe allowed the Government to use part of his farm as a military training camp for World War I, to replace the Trentham Military Camp that had to be evacuated. An engineer laid out the camp, to ensure it did not have the same draining, sanitation and water supply issues as Trentham. The camp was originally based on the Rangiotu School, and Rangiotu Memorial Hall was expanded to help accommodate the soldiers.

The camp was later moved by hand one mile west, opposite Pyke's Road. The 3000 acre site could accommodate 2000 men, with a ban on wheeled vehicles to avoid cutting up the land. A photograph of the camp, held in the collection of the National Library of New Zealand, shows rows of cone tents laid out across a flat field.

Post-war history

The memorial hall was extended again in 1945 to welcome soldiers returning from World War II.

Te Rangimarie Marae opened in 1858.

In 1976, plans were drawn up for a playing field and speedway in Rangiotu, near the Hikatoto burial ground and Te Rangimarie Marae. A sound barrier was proposed as a way of reducing noise.

In 1996, the Government closed down the Rangiotu School, with a roll of 24 pupils and four classrooms, as part of nationwide closures. The Government agreed to a request from Te Awe Awe family to return the donated school land back to Rangitāne ownership.

Facilities

Rangiotu Memorial Hall has a capacity for 110 people and hosts Anzac Day services, a weekly craft club, an annual community Christmas Party, and school and private events. It has also acted as a Civil Defence Centre during several floods.

Rangiotu also has a war memorial, commemorating about 60 local men who died during World War I and World War II.

Education

References

Populated places in Manawatū-Whanganui
Manawatu District